Tavandar (also Romanized as Avandar, Awandar, and Toondar) is a village in Takab Rural District, Kuhsorkh County, Razavi Khorasan Province, Iran. At the 2006 census, its population was 867, in 209 families.

References 

Populated places in Kuhsorkh County